Heq or HEQ may refer to:

Romanization of Haq, Iran, a village in Haq Rural District
Higher education qualification in Diploma of Higher Education
History of Education Quarterly, a quarterly peer-reviewed academic journal
 Hengshan West railway station, China Railway telegraph code HEQ